Middleton is a village and a civil parish on the A683 road, in the South Lakeland district, in the county of Cumbria, England. Middleton has a church called Holy Ghost Church and a pub called The Head at Middleton. Middleton railway station was opened in 1861 and closed in 1931. The population of the civil parish as taken at the 2011 Census was less than 100. It is therefore included in the parish of Dent.

See also

Listed buildings in Middleton, Cumbria

References

External links
 Cumbria County History Trust: Middleton (nb: provisional research only – see Talk page)

Villages in Cumbria
Civil parishes in Cumbria
South Lakeland District